Bythinella gloeeri is a species of very small freshwater snail, an aquatic gastropod mollusk in the family Amnicolidae (according to the taxonomy of the Gastropoda by Bouchet & Rocroi, 2005).

Distribution
This species is endemic to Bulgaria, and is known only from a river in Lepenitsa Cave, in the Western Rhodopes mountain range.

References

Bythinella
Gastropods described in 2009
Endemic fauna of Bulgaria